was a rensho of the Kamakura shogunate from 1301 to 1305.

1242 births
1305 deaths
Hōjō clan
People of Kamakura-period Japan